Tärna IK Fjällvinden in Tärnaby, Sweden is arguably the most successful alpine skiing club in the history of the sport. Although Tärnaby has a population of a mere 500, Fjällvinden has produced several of the greatest alpine skiers of all time: Ingemar Stenmark, Anja Pärson, Stig Strand, Jens Byggmark, and Bengt Fjällberg.

History
IK Fjällvinden was founded in Umfors, while Tärna IK was founded in Tärnaby. The two clubs merged in 1928, adopting cross-country skiing. Alpine skiing was adopted in 1937.

Notable winnings
 Three Olympic gold medals
 One Olympic silver medal
 Five Olympic bronze medals
 Ten World Championship gold medals
 Six World Championship silver medals
 Six World Championship bronze medals
 129 Alpine Skiing World Cup victories
 More than 100 Swedish National Championship gold medals.
 5 overall World Cup victories
 22 World Cup discipline victories

FIS Alpine World Ski Championships
Anja Pärson: 7 gold, 2 silver, 4 bronze
Ingemar Stenmark: 3 gold, 1 silver, 1 bronze
Jens Byggmark: 3 silver
Bengt Fjällberg: 1 bronze

Winter Olympics
Ingemar Stenmark: 2 gold, 1 bronze
Anja Pärson: 1 gold, 1 silver, 4 bronze

FIS World Cup discipline champions
Ingemar Stenmark: 3 overall, 8 slalom, 8 giant slalom
Anja Pärson: 2 overall, 3 giant slalom, 1 slalom, 1 combined
Stig Strand: 1 slalom

Etymology
The name "Fjällvinden" fittingly translates to "The wind on the mountains".

References

External links 
Tärna I.K. Fjällvinden homepage

Alpine skiing organizations
Ski clubs in Sweden
1928 establishments in Sweden
Sports clubs established in 1928
Gymnastics clubs